Gábor Heritesz (Budapest, 1948) well-known sculptor. 
 
Gábor Heritesz won Munkácsy Mihály Award in 1998. Laborcz Ferenc taught Gábor sculptor art. Gábor won prize of the Institute of Public Education in 1977. He spent his time during the study tour in Bulgaria and (Germany).
He became a constructivist sculptor, with his geometric form arts. Gábor Heritesz participated with his metal art sculpture in the International Steel Sculpture Workshop and Symposium in 1987.
He created new sculptures in Győr Sculptor Workshop, Tokai Sculptor Workshop. Minimal art also characterized his style, he used many different types of materials such as precious wood, polished steel, brazen, iron.

Group exhibitions
 2012 KOGART, Budapest
 2011 Contemporary Sculptures of the KOGART Contemporary Art Collection, Dom Umenia, Bratislava
 1986 III. International Bienniale of statuette, Schwabenlandhalle, Fellbach
 1983 Results artistic symposiums, I., statuary, Műcsarnok, Budapest – Gallery of Józsefvárosi, Budapest – Hungarian medal, London

Works in collections
 Cavellini, Marialaura Marazzi Brescia
 Communa de Villasimius, Cagliari
 Franco Dagani, Brescia
 Gaudens Pedit, Lienz
 Giuseppe Baldini, Bologna
 Neue Galerie am Landesmuseum Joanneum, Graz
 Roland Riz, Bolzano

Public sculptures
 Metalplastic (1987, Dunaújváros, outdoor sculpture park)
 II. World War monument (limestone, black granite, 1991, Iregszemcse, Kossuth Square)
 Naturalness (wood, 1993, Nagyatád, sculpture park)

References

Links
 bio of Gábor Heritesz

1948 births
Hungarian sculptors
Living people